Hemisphere   is the largest sailing catamaran (two hulls) and the largest sailing private yacht catamaran in the World since 2011. The vessel has won five different industry awards, including for the interior finishing. In suitable weather Hemisphere goes , with a top sailing speed of 20 knots. VPLP collaborated with Michael Leach Design for the interior design, and the yacht has over 1300 square feet of deck space. Some of the deck spaces include areas including the wheelhouse, flybridge, and salon.

Although Hemisphere was completed in the UK at Pendennis, it was started at another yard and had to be towed, partially complete to the new yard.

Specifications:
Gross tonnage: 499 tons (this is type of measure of interior volume not weight of boat)
Displacement 300 tons
Length 
Beam 
Mast height 
Sail area 12,037 (max) square feet

See also
List of large sailing yachts

References

External links
Hemisphere sailing catamaran
Hemisphere stats (Marine traffic)

Individual catamarans
Individual sailing yachts
Sailing yachts designed by VPLP